Brunei National Roads System (Malay; Sistem Jalan Kebangsaan Brunei: Jawi; سيستم جالن كبڠسأن بروني) is the main national road network in Brunei. It was built and maintained by the Public Works Department.

Major highways in Brunei are built under dual carriageway standards, while other roads are built as single carriageways. Road signs are coloured green with white text (white with black text for denoting nearby locations).

Speed limits
The maximum speed limit for dual carriageways in Brunei is generally 100 km/h. Meanwhile, the maximum speed limit for single-carriageway roads is 80 km/h. Lower speed limits may apply in urban areas.

List of roads and highways

Highways
 Muara–Tutong Highway
 Sultan Hassanal Bolkiah Highway
 Tungku Highway
 Tungku–Jerudong Highway
 Duli Pengiran Muda Mahkota Al-Muhtadee Billah Highway
 Tutong–Telisai Highway
 Seria By Pass Highway
 Telisai–Lumut Highway
 Brunei-Temburong Highway including Temburong Bridge

Notable roads

 Jalan Utama Berakas
 Jalan Serasa
 Jalan Muara

Transport in Brunei